The Château de Montataire is a 12th-century castle in the commune of Montataire in the Oise département of France.

The castle was constructed in the 12th century by Count Renaud II de Clermont on the orders of the king. It comprises a right-angled corps de logis flanked by four round towers of different diameters. The building was subject to several alterations up to the 19th century. The grounds now contain several buildings but are not accessible to the public.

The castle is in the rue de l'Église, but is not visible from the public domain except at a distance from the rue Lénine in the east.

See also
List of castles in France

References

Castles in Hauts-de-France
Oise